Ekaterina Andreyevna Paltceva (born 17 April 1997) is a Russian boxer.

She won a medal at the 2019 AIBA Women's World Boxing Championships.

References

1997 births
Living people
AIBA Women's World Boxing Championships medalists
Russian women boxers
Light-flyweight boxers
World light-flyweight boxing champions